The ATB Financial Classic is a golf tournament on PGA Tour Canada. It was first played in 2007, and was merged with the Edmonton Open in 2010. From 2007 to 2015, it was played at a different course in Alberta each year. From 2016 to 2021, it was played at Country Hills Golf Club in Calgary. In 2022, it moved to Edmonton Petroleum Golf and Country Club in Edmonton. The main sponsor is ATB Financial.

Winners

References

External links

Coverage on PGA Tour Canada's official site

PGA Tour Canada events
Golf tournaments in Alberta
Sport in Alberta
Recurring sporting events established in 2007
2007 establishments in Alberta